The Institute of Cost and Management Accountants of Pakistan (ICMAP) is a professional accounting body offering qualification and training in management accountancy.

The Institute of Cost and Management Accountants of Pakistan was established in 1951 and was granted statutory status under the Cost and Management Accountants Act, 1966 for the regulation of the profession of Cost and Management Accounting. ICMAP is a full member of International Federation of Accountants (IFAC), International Accounting Standards Board (IASB), Confederation of Asian and Pacific Accountants (CAPA) and South Asian Federation of Accountants (SAFA).

References 

Member bodies of the International Federation of Accountants
Pakistan federal departments and agencies
1951 establishments in Pakistan
Government agencies established in 1951